The 2021–22 season was Al-Fateh's 13th consecutive season in the Pro League and their 64th year in existence. The club participated in the Pro League and the King Cup.

The season covered the period from 1 July 2021 to 30 June 2022.

Players

Squad information

Out on loan

Transfers and loans

Transfers in

Loans in

Transfers out

Loans out

Pre-season

Competitions

Overview

Goalscorers

Last Updated: 27 June 2022

Assists

Last Updated: 27 June 2022

Clean sheets

Last Updated: 29 May 2022

References

Al-Fateh SC seasons
Fateh